Cúla4 is an Irish language programming block and a stand-alone television channel for Irish speaking children in the Republic of Ireland and Northern Ireland. It is operated by the Irish broadcaster TG4. On 11 April 2022, Cúla4 was rebranded, with a new logo.

Development
The strand was first established in 1996 as Cúlabúla; with the rebrand of TnaG to TG4 in 1999 Cúlabúla was renamed "Cúla4". 
As of 1 September 2009 Cúla4 is available as a separate channel to Virgin Media Ireland customers on channel 602.  A new schedule coincided with the launch on UPC.

The majority of programming is a mixture of homegrown and international programmes which are either dubbed or subtitled in Irish. Cúla4 works with international broadcasters to produce Irish versions of hit TV series which are seen on Nickelodeon, Cartoon Network, PBS and Discovery Family. It also works with homegrown animation companies to produce localized series. Cúla4 offers something unique in an already saturated kids television market in Ireland with the existence of RTÉjr/TRTÉ, Nickelodeon, Cartoon Network and the Disney Channel. Cúla4's programming is either in Irish or in Irish and English, unlike its competition where the majority of their programmes are entirely in English.

Cúla4 ar Scoil
An educational programme, Cúla4 Ar Scoil ("Cúla 4 at School"), was created in April 2020, in response to the closure of all schools during the COVID-19 pandemic in the Republic of Ireland in 2020. This followed RTÉ's launch of its Home School Hub in March 2020. It is recorded in Connemara, with teachers Caitriona ni Chualain and Fiachra O Dubhghaill presenting daily lessons for the 30-minute show. A second series began in September with teachers Orla Ní Fhinneadha and Micheál Ó Dubhghaill.
·

Cúla4 Channel
In November 2021, TG4 announced that it planned to make Cúla4 as a channel available for all Irish TV providers. The channel is set to launch in 2023.

Programming

Strands

Cúla4 Na nÓg: Aired between 07:30 - 09:00, it was a programming block targeting pre-school children ages 2 to 5, and aired series such as Elmo's World, Sesame Street, Dora the Explorer (in Irish, teaching Spanish), Ni Hao Kai Lan, Franny's Feet, Inui, Helen's Little School, Rev and Roll, Timmy Time, Olobob Top, Kid-e-Cats, Florrie's Dragons, Wow Wow Wubbzy, Zou, Dive, Olly, Dive, Mouk, and The Mr. Men Show. All programmes were in the Irish language. The block was discontinued on 11 April 2022 following Culá4's rebrand.
CÚLA4: Airs in the afternoon between 14:00-16:50, targeting 6 to 11 year olds. Programmes include Ben 10, Johnny Test, SpongeBob SquarePants, Scaredy Squirrel, Back at the Barnyard, Eliot Kid, The Mighty B!, Skunk Fu, Bog Stop, Fanboy & Chum Chum and Clarence.
PONC: Aired between 16:50-19:00, targeting 12 to 18 year olds, PONC hosted a number of live action drama series such as Aifric (which is also shown in Scotland on BBC Alba), and international shows such as H2O, Life with Derek, 8 Simple Rules, Pimp My Ride, My Super Sweet 16, The Hills, The City, Gossip Girl, South Park, One Tree Hill, Dance Academy, Switched at Birth, Wipeout and What I Like About You. It also showed a number of extreme sports shows such as Planet X and Groms Tour. This programming block was hosted by Máire Treasa Ní Dhubhghaill and Colmán Mac Séalaigh. It was discontinued sometime in the early 2010's.

See also
 The Den
 Nickelodeon
Cyw - Welsh language children's channel

References

External links

Children's television networks
Irish-language television shows
Television channels and stations established in 2009
Television programming blocks in Europe
Television stations in Ireland
TG4 original programming